Herman IX, Margrave of Baden-Eberstein (died 13 April 1353) was a titular Margrave of Baden and a ruling Lord of Eberstein

He was the son of Margrave Frederick II and his first wife Agnes of Weinsberg (d. 3 May 1320). When his father died in 1333, he succeeded him as Margrave of Baden-Eberstein.

In 1344, he delivered Yburg Castle to Margrave Rudolf IV (d. 1348).  In 1350, after Rudolf IV's death, Emperor Charles IV enfeoffed Yburg Castle again to Herman IX.  In the same year, he purchased the village of Mörsch from Herrenalb Abbey.  Rudolph IV had sold the village to the abbey, with an option to buy it back.

On or before 3 June 1341, he married Mathilda of Vaihingen (d. 13 April 1381).  They had one son, Frederick IV.

Herman IX died in 1353.  As Frederick IV had died before him, Eberstein fell to his first cousin once removed Rudolf VI of the main Baden-Baden line.

See also 
 List of rulers of Baden

Margraves of Baden
Year of birth unknown
1353 deaths
14th-century German nobility